Louis G. Hill (March 10, 1924 – July 13, 2013) was a former member of the Pennsylvania State Senate, serving from 1967 to 1978. He was born in 1924 in Palm Beach, Florida to Crawford and Ann Kaufman Hill.

In 1975 he ran in the Democratic primary for Mayor of Philadelphia against incumbent Frank Rizzo and lost.

He was elected Judge in the Philadelphia Municipal Court in 1978 and then to the Court of Common Pleas serving from 1980-1998.

He died on July 13, 2013 at a nursing home, after suffering from Alzheimer's disease.

References

Democratic Party Pennsylvania state senators
2013 deaths
1924 births
Harvard University alumni
University of Pennsylvania Law School alumni